Penzberg (Central Bavarian: Benschberg) is a city (although some see it as a town) in the Weilheim-Schongau district, in Bavaria, Germany. It is located about 50 km south of Munich, and had a population of around 17,000 in 2020. A historic coal mining town, Penzberg today is known for its pharmaceutical industries.

History
The settlement was first mentioned as Poennesperch in a 1275 contract, when it was sold to the Benediktbeuern Abbey. Surface coal mining had already started in the 16th century, though it was ended by the Thirty Years' War and the industrial exploitation of coal did not begin until 1800. In 1919 Penzberg received town privileges.

World War 2
An allied air raid on 16 November 1944 severely damaged the town, including the parish church, but did not affect the local coal mine, the heart of the town's economic life.

In order to follow Hitler's "scorched earth" policy (Nero Decree), the local Nazi leaders wanted to blow up the coal mine which was the economic life blood of the town (The End: Hitler's Germany 1944–45 by Ian Kershaw – p344), so, on 28 April 1945  (the social democratic mayor of Penzberg until the Nazi takeover in 1933) and others deposed the Nazi mayor. However, it was not long before the officer commanding a local Wehrmacht unit had the leaders of the revolt arrested. When, on the evening of the same day, Gauleiter Paul Giesler heard about the incident, he gave orders that the leaders were to be shot immediately without trial. To achieve this, a Werwolf group, around 100 strong, was dispatched, storming the town hall. They arrested and shot Rummer and seven fellows. During the night, a further eight suspected resistance fighters were hanged by a "drumhead court-martial" under SA brigade leader . Among the victims were two women, one of them pregnant. The very next day, the Americans arrived. The mine was not destroyed, and remained open until 1966 when it closed for economic reasons; the adjacent power plant was also shut down in 1971.

Transport
The town is served by Penzberg station on the Kochelsee Railway.

Important buildings
 Post office by Robert Vorhoelzer in the then dominant "Heimatstil", 1922-1923

Notable people

 Verena Eberle (born 1950), former German swimmer
 Ludwig Kögl (born 1966), soccer players including FC Bayern München and TSV 1860 München
 Max Kruse (author) (1921-2015), children's books author ( Urmel aus dem Eis )
 Norbert Reithofer (born 1956), former chairman of the board of managing directors and current supervisory board of BMW
 Helmut Schlesinger (born 1924), former president of the Bundesbank
 Jochen Schümann (born 1954), sailor and winner of the America's Cup with 
 Karl Wald (1916-2011), football matchmaker and inventor of the penalty shoot-out
 Klaus Wolfermann (born 1946), former German athletic track (spearhead)

References

Weilheim-Schongau